Yasmin Wijnaldum (born July 10, 1998) is a Dutch fashion model. She is known for her confident runway walk.

Early life
Wijnaldum was born in Amsterdam, Netherlands. Her father is from Suriname, and her mother from the Netherlands. She was born and raised in Amsterdam and currently resides in New York City, having moved there when she was 17 years old. She has an older brother and an older sister. She has been dating Thomas Doherty since 2021.

Career
Wijnaldum made her modeling debut during the 2014 Elite Model Look competition, where she represented the Netherlands during the world final and won a contract with Elite Model Management's Amsterdam branch. After signing to Elite Worldwide and The Society, Wijnaldum made her runway debut at the Jean-Paul Gaultier Haute Couture F/W 15 show, and walked exclusively for Prada during the S/S 16 show season, where she subsequently booked the S/S 16 campaign alongside Sasha Pivovarova and Natalia Vodianova. Her first magazine cover was for I-D Magazine'''s Summer 2016 issue. In 2018, she made her debut at the 2018 Victoria's Secret Fashion Show.

In 2017, Wijnaldum was chosen as one of the "11 Models You Need to Know" by Vogue Arabia.

From 2017 to 2019, Wijnaldum was listed as one of Models' "Top 50" models and was also ranked on its former "Top Sexiest" list. She was ranked in 2018 on the Business of Fashion'''s annual list of 500 people shaping the fashion industry.

References

External links
Yasmin Wijnaldum at Models.

1998 births
Living people
Dutch female models
Models from Amsterdam
Dutch people of Surinamese descent
Dutch expatriates in the United States
The Society Management models
Elite Model Management models
Prada exclusive models
Models from New York City